Hendrella quinquincisa is a species of tephritid or fruit flies in the genus Hendrella of the family Tephritidae.

Distribution
Mongolia.

References

Tephritinae
Insects described in 1989
Diptera of Asia